Christophe Priou (born 2 May 1958 in Nantes) is a French politician of The Republicans who served as a member of the National Assembly of France from 2002 until 2017, representing the Loire-Atlantique department.

In the Republicans’ 2016 presidential primaries, Priou endorsed François Fillon as the party's candidate for the office of President of France.

References

1958 births
Living people
Politicians from Nantes
Rally for the Republic politicians
Union for a Popular Movement politicians
Gaullism, a way forward for France
Deputies of the 12th National Assembly of the French Fifth Republic
Deputies of the 13th National Assembly of the French Fifth Republic
Deputies of the 14th National Assembly of the French Fifth Republic
Senators of Loire-Atlantique